CBE: Life Sciences Education is an online, quarterly journal owned and published by the American Society for Cell Biology, with funding from Howard Hughes Medical Institute. The journal publishes peer-reviewed articles on life sciences education research and evidence-based practice at the K-12, undergraduate, and graduate levels. One goal of the journal is to encourage teachers and instructors to view teaching and learning the way scientists view their research, as an intellectual undertaking that is informed by systematic collection, analysis, and interpretation of data related to student learning. Target audiences include those involved in education in K-12 schools, two-year colleges, four-year colleges, science centers and museums, universities, and professional schools, including graduate students and postdoctoral researchers. All published articles are available freely online without subscription. In addition, published articles are indexed in PubMed and available through PubMed Central. The journal's 2018 impact factor was 2.380.

Erin Dolan replaced William (Bill) Wood) as editor-in-chief on August 1, 2010. In 2013, the Genetics Society of America and American Society for Cell Biology announced an editorial partnership to collaborate on the publication of the journal.

References

External links

Biology journals
Quarterly journals
Publications established in 2002
American Society for Cell Biology